Team Halfords was a British UCI Continental cycling team that existed only for the 2009 season.

Major wins
2009
East Midlands International CiCLE Classic, Ian Wilkinson
Stage 2 FBD Insurance Rás, Ian Wilkinson

References

UCI Continental Teams (Europe)
Cycling teams established in 2009
Cycling teams disestablished in 2009
Cycling teams based in the United Kingdom
Defunct cycling teams based in the United Kingdom